is a gay-themed Japanese film written and directed by Takehiro Nakajima, released in 1992. It is also a common slang term.

Cast

Awards 
 1992 Hochi Film Award: Best Actress (Misa Shimizu), Best Supporting Actor (Takehiro Murata)
 1993 Kinema Junpo Award: Best Supporting Actor (Takehiro Murata)
 1993 Mainichi Film Award: Best Supporting Actor (Takehiro Murata)
 1992 The Nikkan Sports Film Award: Best Newcomer (Misa Shimizu), Best Supporting Actor (Takehiro Murata)
 1992 Yokohama Film Festival: Best Actress (Misa Shimizu)
 1993 Japan Academy Prize: Best Supporting Actor nomination (Takehiro Murata)

See also 
List of lesbian, gay, bisexual or transgender-related films
Tokyo International Lesbian & Gay Film Festival

References

External links 

 

1992 films
1992 LGBT-related films
Japanese LGBT-related films
Gay-related films
1990s Japanese films